William George Stefaniak  (born 8 January 1952) is an Australian politician and former Australian Capital Territory Minister. He was the Leader of the Opposition in the Australian Capital Territory after succeeding in a leadership challenge against then-leader Brendan Smyth on 16 May 2006. He is a former Major in the Australian Army Reserve and a law graduate of the Australian National University. On 13 December 2007, he was replaced as Liberal Leader by Zed Seselja. Stefaniak contested the 2020 Australian Capital Territory General Election as leader of the Belco Party but was not elected.

He was one of the five members for the district of Ginninderra from 1995 to 2008. Following the end of his term in Parliament, Stefaniak became appeal president of the ACT Civil and Administrative Tribunal.

Background 
Stefaniak grew up in Canberra and attended Narrabundah College.

External links
 Belco Party - Bill Stefaniak
 Canberra Liberals: Bill Stefaniak (archive)

References 

1952 births
Living people
Liberal Party of Australia members of the Australian Capital Territory Legislative Assembly
Members of the Australian Capital Territory Legislative Assembly
Leaders of the Opposition in the Australian Capital Territory
Attorneys-General of the Australian Capital Territory
Members of the Order of Australia
Recipients of the Centenary Medal
21st-century Australian politicians
People educated at Narrabundah College